Loree K. Sutton (born July 15, 1959) is an American psychiatrist and retired military officer who served as a brigadier general in the United States Army. Sutton served for over 20 years and was awarded a Bronze Star. From 2007 to 2010, She was the Army's highest-ranking psychiatrist. In 2014, New York City Mayor Bill de Blasio appointed Sutton as Commissioner of the New York City Department of Veterans' Services. Sutton was a candidate in the 2021 New York City Democratic mayoral primary.

Early life and education
Sutton was born and raised in Loma Linda, California. Her mother, Lavaun Sutton, was a former cardiac intensive care nurse.

Sutton graduated from Pacific Union College with a Bachelor of Science in business administration in 1981. Sutton graduated from medical school at Loma Linda University in 1985, and completed her internship and residency in psychiatry at Letterman Army Medical Center. She is also a graduate of the U.S. Army Command and General Staff College, with an M.S. in national security strategic studies, and the National War College.

Career

Military service
Sutton served in the United States military for over 20 years. She was deployed to Saudi Arabia, Iraq, Kuwait, and Egypt in support of the first Gulf War and other missions.

Sutton was commander of the Carl R. Darnall Army Medical Center in Fort Hood, Texas, beginning in 2005, commander of the DeWitt Army Community Hospital, Deputy Commander for clinical services at the General Leonard Wood Army Community Hospital, and a special assistant to the Surgeon General of the United States Army.

Sutton was the founding director of the Defense Centers of Excellence for Psychological Health and Traumatic Brain Injury in 2007, and was a special assistant to the Assistant Secretary of Defense for Health Affairs. She was the United States Army's highest-ranking psychiatrist from 2007 to 2010.

During her career, Sutton received many awards, including the Legion of Merit, Bronze Star Medal, Defense Meritorious Service Medal, and Order of Military Medical Merit. She was one of only 15 female generals out of the 1.3 million soldiers serving in the Army. She retired from the military in 2010.

Politics

In 2014, New York City Mayor Bill de Blasio appointed Sutton as Commissioner of the Mayor's Office of Veterans’ Affairs, and from 2017 to 2019, was the Commissioner of the newly formed New York City Department of Veterans’ Services. She resigned in October 2019 to launch her campaign for Mayor of New York City. She struggled to raise money and never polled higher than 2%, resulting in her dropping out on March 10, 2021.

References

External links
 

Living people
Pacific Union College alumni
Female generals of the United States Army
American psychiatrists
American Seventh-day Adventists
Defense Centers of Excellence for Psychological Health and Traumatic Brain Injury
Recipients of the Legion of Merit
1959 births
Brigadier generals
Loma Linda University alumni
United States Army Command and General Staff College alumni
New York (state) Democrats
People from Loma Linda, California
LGBT people from New York (state)
United States Army personnel of the Gulf War
United States Army Medical Corps officers
Candidates in the 2021 United States elections